UIC College Prep is a public. four-year Charter high school located in Chicago, Illinois. It is operated by the Noble Network of Charter Schools. The school has a partnership with the University of Illinois at Chicago.

Background

History 
UIC College Prep, the LSV Campus of the Noble Network of Charter Schools was founded in 2008. It is named for LSV Asset Management  support of Noble's expansion. A close partnership with the University of Illinois at Chicago lends its name to the school.

Partnership with the University of Illinois at Chicago 
UIC's partnership with UICCP is governed by a formal memorandum of understanding. The high school's day-to-day operations are the responsibility of UICCP and Noble Network staff. UIC's major responsibility is to coordinate support from UIC faculty and staff for UICCP's academic and co-curricular programs and to support student success initiatives for both current UICCP students and UICCP graduates who have matriculated to UIC.

References

External links
Max Preps: UIC College Prep
UIC Office Of High School Development: UIC College Prep
TheCharterSCALE: UIC College Prep

2008 establishments in Illinois
Noble Network of Charter Schools
Educational institutions established in 2008
Public high schools in Chicago
University of Illinois Chicago